Chasmatophyllum maninum is a species of plant from South Africa.

Description 
Each branch has six to eight leaves. They are variable in shape and have one minute tooth. Flowers are present between September and October. Each flower has five sepals. The petals are dense and occur in two or three rows.

Distribution 
This species is endemic to South Africa. It is known from the Middelburg region in the Eastern Cape. It has also been found in the Northern Cape, close to where this province borders the Eastern Cape.

Conservation status 
Currently, not enough information is known about this species to be able to accurately assess its risk of extinction. As such, it is classified as being data deficient by the South African National Biodiversity Institute.

References 

Plants described in 1927
Flora of South Africa
Aizoaceae